The Wall Game is a 1985 children's television game show produced by Thames Television for ITV. The show was based on the idea of a theatre workshop and would see two groups of contestants building sets from pieces of a giant wall, then improvise a play. The programme was conceived and presented by Hal Lehrman, Jr and also starred Helen Bennett, Anthony Johns and Sinitta (who also performed the theme song) in series one. Deborah Goodman, Andrie Reid and John Ramm joined Lehrman and Johns in series two. The series was chosen to represent Britain at the 1985 Tokyo World's Fair.

Transmission guide
Series 1: 13 editions from 16 April 1985 – 9 July 1985
Series 2: 12 editions from 8 January 1986 – 2 April 1986

External links
 The Wall Game at BFI

1985 British television series debuts
1986 British television series endings
ITV children's television shows